The City Hall and Firehouse, built in , is an historic city hall and fire station building located  on the corner of Crawford and Water streets in  Bainbridge, Georgia. It was designed by Atlanta-based architect William Augustus Edwards who designed nine South Carolina courthouses as well as academic buildings at twelve institutions in Florida, Georgia and South Carolina.

In , the Bainbridge-Decatur County Arts Council bought the building from the City of Bainbridge. It is now the Firehouse Arts Center.

See also
National Register of Historic Places listings in Decatur County, Georgia

References

External links 

 
 

Art museums and galleries in Georgia (U.S. state)
Buildings and structures in Decatur County, Georgia
City and town halls on the National Register of Historic Places in Georgia (U.S. state)
City halls in Georgia (U.S. state)
Defunct fire stations in Georgia (U.S. state)
Fire stations completed in 1914
Fire stations on the National Register of Historic Places in Georgia (U.S. state)
Government buildings completed in 1914
Historic district contributing properties in Georgia (U.S. state)
National Register of Historic Places in Decatur County, Georgia
Tourist attractions in Decatur County, Georgia
William Augustus Edwards buildings